Hey Ash, Whatcha Playin'? (HAWP) is an independently produced series of sketch comedy videos created by siblings Anthony Burch and Ashly Burch. The series uses surreal humor and comical sibling rivalry to examine the themes, industry trends, and societal impact of video games, with each episode typically focusing on a single game. HAWP was hosted on Destructoid for its first year of production, and syndicated to GameTrailers until 2013, and has since become independently distributed, most notably on YouTube. , the series has received over 60 million views.

History

Hey Ash, Whatcha Playin'? was conceived during the summer of 2008, while Ashly and Anthony Burch still lived at home with their parents in Phoenix, Arizona. Anthony Burch was a game reviewer at Destructoid, his Rev Rant video features expressing his opinions of tropes commonly seen in contemporary games. Having established an audience on the website, he posted the first HAWP episode on May 28, 2008. The siblings collaborated over the course of the summer to produce one episode per week, playing mildly exaggerated versions of themselves: Anthony using his deadpan, fast-spoken, strongly opinionated nature, and Ashly antagonizing him both verbally and physically. Over time, as the siblings fine-tuned the comedy and timing of the show, these aspects have come to define their characters.

Discussing the genesis of the series, Anthony states:

Ashly Burch describes the nature of their collaboration:

Since the latter half of the second season, friend and occasional contributor Justin Yngelmo has been credited as co-writer, director, and editor of the series.

A short film collaboration between the Hey Ash crew and Freddie Wong premiered at the 2014 Sundance Film Festival as part of Nintendo's official contribution.

Format

Almost every episode begins with Ashly, comfortably seated with a controller, as her brother walks up behind her and title-drops the show. Ashly then answers him with the episode's game in a childlike accent. All audio here is supplemented with a game font, and the camera abruptly clips to the content of the week's episode.

The episodes vary in tone, but usually incorporate a great deal of surreal humor. For instance, in one early episode, Ashly re-enacts aspects of Super Mario World 2: Yoshi's Island, strapping a toy child to her back and crushing cupcakes with her posterior on a countertop. Another early episode involves her re-enacting portions of Professor Layton, involving her poking around for hint coins and solving a bizarre puzzle that involves prostitutes. As the seasons progressed, the comedy was tightened through advances in editing and script-writing, and Justin Yngelmo added production value and a refined approach to the creation of new episodes.

Each episode ends with credits in the same font, sometimes involving a line or two of amusing commentary. After DVD releases or other projects by the siblings, promotional notice is given for a slide or two. As of Season Two, the ending theme song was changed to "The Massacre" by chiptune artist FantomenK, to avoid copyright infringement. Occasionally, a brief stinger will appear, after which the credits will finish.

Characters

Ashly Burch

Manic, wild Ashly Burch, the eponymous "Ash" of the show's title, plays the unhinged Burch sibling. She regularly and unrelentingly antagonizes her brother, characterizing him on-camera as weak and effeminate. She is usually supported in her frequent bashing of his character by inaction from anyone else present, to his vocal chagrin. On some occasions, a character usurps her, or she will accidentally place herself in a position of detriment: examples include The Sims pool scene at the hands of Leigh Davis, Papa Burch's effortless position above her such as in The Lord of the Rings episode, or Ashly accidentally defecating in her own bed while attempting to ruin Anthony's room.

Anthony Burch
Anthony Burch, usually portrayed as the single sane character of the series, acts as a foil to Ashly. He is almost always the recipient of his sister's lunacy and absurdity, and usually ignores or calls sarcastic attention to her wild actions. Other characters often comment that he smells bad. If a character is wounded in any episode, it will typically be Anthony, who will fail to receive any aid from the others.

Papa Burch
Breakout cameo character Papa Burch (David Burch) is the patriarch of the Burch household, and an avid reader of romance novels. In one early episode, he was shown to have an encyclopedic knowledge of the Twilight Saga, and is usually given a brief one-or-two line appearance per episode. His minimal involvement in the show lends greater comedy to his short appearances, and he appears to be the progenitor of both Ashly's loose grip on reality and Anthony's deadpan attitude. He attends panels focused on his children's work and is a consistent fan favorite.

Leigh Davis
Leigh Davis is the creator and producer of Once Upon a Pixel, a spin-off web series dedicated to re-envisioning video game characters and plots in a fairy tale-esque approach. She was the real-life wife of Anthony Burch  making the transition from girlfriend to fiance on-camera during the surprise intro to The Sims episode of HAWP. Her character shows an adoring and wide-eyed attitude towards the antics of the siblings, but on two occasions, she has shown a darker side by fatally threatening Ashly Burch. While she was initially an extra in the early episodes, her presence has gradually increased, and now she is usually seen in each episode until the season 5 finale following her real life divorce from Anthony Burch.

Reception
Hey Ash, Whatcha Playin'? has received positive reviews since its inception. The cast regularly appears at the Penny Arcade Expo conventions to meet with fans and discuss the evolution of video game culture. Video game voice actor David Hayter, the voice actor of Solid Snake in the Metal Gear Solid series, contributed his voice to the Season One finale.

Other work
Anthony Burch is an employee at Rocket Jump; he took the position after leaving his former post as a writer at video game developer Gearbox Software. He was the lead writer for Borderlands 2. Anthony is also the co-writer and co-star of the defunct web series "Anthony Saves the World", and contributed to the Telltale Games' episodic adventure, Tales From the Borderlands. He worked for Riot Games, Visual Concepts and Santa Monica Studio.

Ashly Burch has starred in several small shorts as well as a 2012 feature-film, Must Come Down, written by Kenny Riches and produced by Patrick Fugit. She also lent her voice to Tiny Tina, a non-playable character in Borderlands 2, as well as the Bane, a "cursed" gun that yells annoying sounds and phrases while severely restricting the user's movement. In addition, she provided the voices of Ayla in the game Awesomenauts Reid in Aliens: Colonial Marines, and Miss Pauling in Valve's Team Fortress 2 short videos.  Ashly voiced Chloe Price in Dontnod Entertainment's video game Life Is Strange, for which she won a Golden Joystick Award. Most recently Burch voiced the protagonist, Aloy in Horizon Zero Dawn, which won her two Golden Joystick Awards and got her a nomination at The Game Awards.

The three HAWP-characters Papa, Anthony and Ashly Burch were all featured as Downloadable Content for the 2013 video game Saints Row IV. They were all voiced by the original cast and could be called by phone to help the player out in battle or to just hang out with. They can be called separately, however when called together they converse with each other in similar ways as in Hey Ash, Whatcha Playin'?.

Leigh Davis currently produces a Web Comic named JailBird as well as running her own website oddlookingbird.com.

HAWPcast & HeyAshTwitch
The show is also the subject of the podcast "HAWPcast", originally involving only Anthony and Ashly Burch, but expanded to include Leigh Davis and Justin Yngelmo, among others. It was updated infrequently and typically surrounded video game philosophy as well as various insights into their lives and backstories, usually around an hour long apiece. The standard HAWPcasts at one point were almost completely replaced by a format called "Keepin' It Real" where the HAWP crew interviewed notable members of the game industry. Regular HAWPcasts returned in 2015 but ceased in 2016. The HAWPcast was often streamed on their Twitch channel.

Episodes

Upload dates refer to the date the episode was uploaded to GameTrailers.com.

Season 1 (2008–2009)

Season 2 (2009–2010)

Season 3 (2011–2012)

Season 4 (2012–2013)

Season 5 (2015–2016)

Specials (2013–2019)

References

2008 web series debuts
American comedy web series
Video game blogs
Parodies of video games